Chah Jamali (also Romanized as Chāh Jamalī) is a village in Nimbeluk Rural District, Nimbeluk District, Qaen County, South Khorasan Province, Iran. At the 2006 census, its population was 41, in 9 families.

References 

Populated places in Qaen County